The Deloitte Technology Fast 500 Awards are run and moderated by international professional services group Deloitte Touche Tohmatsu Limited. They recognize the 500 fastest-growing technology companies in regions around the world. Winners include both public and private companies.

The awards were created in 1997 during the dotcom boom to illustrate the success of growing U.S. technology companies.  Today, the Fast 500 has expanded beyond the United States and covers North America; Asia Pacific; and Europe, the Middle East and Africa (EMEA).

The Fast 500 examines companies on their relative growth in revenue over a three-year period. A company that grew by $1million from a revenue of $2million will rank below a company that grew by $500,000 from a revenue of $100,000.  The Fast 500 seeks to reward companies that have demonstrated cutting edge business strategies, vision and solid management.

The Fast 500 has three main international divisions:
 Fast 500 EMEA
 Fast 500 North America 
 Fast 500 Asia Pacific

Fast 500 EMEA

2014 Winners

For 2014, France remained the most represented country, marking the 4th consecutive year. The United Kingdom trailed France, followed by Sweden. Israeli companies comprised five of the top ten companies on the list. The software sector represented 42% of the overall rankings on this year’s EMEA Fast 500, followed by the Internet sector with 21%. Rounding out the sector list was Telecommunications/Networking (13%), Semiconductors/Components/Electronics (7%), Biotech/Pharmaceutical/Medical Equipment (7%), Greentech (5%), Media/Entertainment (3%), and Computers/Peripherals (2%). A full listing of the 2014 Deloitte Technology Fast 500 Europe, Middle East & Africa (EMEA) winners can be found online.

2013 Winners

The Technology Fast 500 EMEA Winners 2013 had an overall average revenue growth rate of 1,403%, a slight decrease from the 1,549% growth rate for 2012. Leading the list, the software sector represented 43% of the overall rankings on this year’s EMEA Fast 500, followed by the Internet sector with 22%. A full listing of the 2013 Deloitte Technology Fast 500 Europe, Middle East & Africa (EMEA) winners can be found here.

Deloitte Technology Fast 50
The Deloitte Technology Fast 50 Awards, created in 1995, is a subset of the Fast 500 and represents an inner circle of winners. The Fast 50 award is made at regional or country level in a number of geographies around the world. The Deloitte Technology Fast 50 program ranks fast growing technology companies, public or private, based on percentage revenue growth over three years.

References

External links
Fast 500 United States 
Fast 500 Asia Pacific
Fast 500 EMEA
Fast 50 UK
Fast 50 Central Europe

Awards established in 1997
Deloitte